Harten is a surname of German or Dutch origin. Notable people with the surname include:

Ami Harten (1946–1994), American-Israeli applied mathematician
Joanne Harten (born 1989), English netball player

References

Surnames of German origin
Surnames of Dutch origin